Wheelen House, also known as Fellowship Farm, is a historic home located in Upper Uwchlan Township, Chester County, Pennsylvania, United States.  It was built about 1750, and is a -story, random and coursed fieldstone structure in the Georgian style.  It has a gable roof, end chimneys, and a -story kitchen wing.  The house was restored in the late 1940s to early 1950s.

It was listed on the National Register of Historic Places in 1974.

References 
 

Houses on the National Register of Historic Places in Pennsylvania
Georgian architecture in Pennsylvania
Houses completed in 1750
Houses in Chester County, Pennsylvania
National Register of Historic Places in Chester County, Pennsylvania